Mary Hamm (born Mary Zorn, 12 April 1982) is an American athlete who competes in compound archery. Her achievements include gold medals at the World Archery Championships and Indoor World Championships, and becoming the world number one ranked archer on two occasions in September 2003 and July 2005.

References

1982 births
Living people
American female archers
World Archery Championships medalists
Universiade medalists in archery
Universiade silver medalists for the United States
20th-century American women
21st-century American women